Erwin Galeski (born 29 October 1945) is a retired German football defender.

References

External links
 

1945 births
Living people
German footballers
VfL Bochum players
Bundesliga players
Association football defenders